Lisa Power MBE (born 1954) is a British sexual health and LGBT rights campaigner. She was a volunteer for Lesbian & Gay Switchboard and Secretary General of the International Lesbian and Gay Association. She co-founded the Pink Paper and Stonewall, later becoming Policy Director at the Terrence Higgins Trust. She was the first openly LGBT person to speak at the United Nations and continues to work and volunteer as an LGBT+ and sexual health activist in Wales with groups such as Fast Track Cardiff and Vale and Pride Cymru.

Early life 
Power was born in 1954. She came out as lesbian in the 1970s in a time when homosexuality was still controversial in British society. She worked at the Lesbian & Gay Switchboard in London. At the switchboard, she started to take calls about a mystery illness which became known as GRID (Gay-Related Immune Deficiency) and later HIV/AIDS. She was an early worker on the National AIDS Helpline and worked for Hackney Council and the Association of London Authorities as HIV policy officer.

Career 
Power became Secretary-General of the International Lesbian and Gay Association (now the International Lesbian, Gay, Bisexual, Trans and Intersex Association) in 1988 and then helped to set up the Pink Paper. She co-founded Stonewall in 1989 and subsequently was the policy director of the Terrence Higgins Trust.

In 1991, Power was the first openly LGBT person to speak about gay rights at the United Nations in New York. She was appointed a Member of the Order of the British Empire (MBE) in the 2011 New Year Honours, "for services to sexual health and to the Lesbian, Gay, Bisexual and Transgender community" and was named on the 2017 Pinc List of leading Welsh LGBT figures.

In 2020, she collaborated with National Museum Cardiff and curator Dan Vo on a program called "Queer Tours", which aimed to uncover hidden LGBTQ histories in Cardiff. She is also the Organiser for Pride History Month at Pride Cymru, chairperson of the HIV Justice Network and a trustee the planned Queer Britain museum. On International Women's Day 2020, Power commented "Women are raised with an inner voice of self doubt; tell yours to shut up and let you have a go".

Selected works

References

External links 
 
 Listing of Lisa Power's papers on AIM25

1954 births
Living people
British LGBT rights activists
Members of the Order of the British Empire
HIV/AIDS activists
Welsh women activists
20th-century Welsh women writers
21st-century Welsh women writers
21st-century Welsh writers
Lesbian feminists
Women civil rights activists